Francie is a given name, often a shortened form of Francis (male) or Frances (female).

The name may refer to:

People:
Francie Barrett (born 1977), Irish boxer
Francie Bellew (born 1976), Irish Gaelic footballer
Francie Brolly (born 1947), Northern Ireland Sinn Féin politician
Françoise Ducros, Canadian government official
Francie Kraker Goodridge (born 1947), American former women's track and field athlete and coach
Francie Grehan, Irish Gaelic footballer
Francie Molloy (born 1950), Northern Ireland Sinn Féin politician
Francis O'Brien (Irish politician) (born 1943), Irish former Fianna Fáil politician
Francie Larrieu Smith (born 1952), American middle- and long-distance runner

Other:
Francie (Barbie), a fashion doll produced by Mattel
Francis "Francie" Brady, protagonist of the Irish novel The Butcher Boy
Francie Calfo, a fictional character on the television series Alias
Francie Nolan, heroine of the novel A Tree Grows in Brooklyn, as well as the 1945 film and 1951 Broadway musical adaptations
Francie Stevens, in the 1955 movie To Catch a Thief and the novel on which it was based, played by Grace Kelly in the film
half of the act Francie and Josie, Francie being played by Scottish comedian Jack Milroy
Francie, a character created by American cartoonist Al Columbia

See also
 Frannie

Irish masculine given names
English feminine given names